Léonie Antoinette Tonel (20 April 1828 - 14 January 1886) was a French pianist and composer. An early mention of Tonel was in 1855, when La Presse wrote: "Mlle Léonie Tonèl will be heard at the Exposition [Universelle des produits de l'Agriculture, de l'Industrie et des Beaux-Arts de Paris 1855] on Tuesdays, Thursdays, and Fridays, from 2 PM until 5 PM, on the excellent piano from the house of A. Bord.".

Tonel studied music at the Paris Conservatory, where the jury was so impressed by her performance that they unanimously awarded her a certificate without a competitive exam. She composed works for piano in many styles, which were published in Europe and America by Duncan Davison & Co., G. Schirmer Inc., J. L. Peters, Oliver Ditson, and Schott Music. Many of Tonel's individual compositions were included in collections. There were some discrepancies in opus numbers between her European and American publishers, noted below. Her compositions for piano, using opus numbers through 55, included:

A l'aventure. Caprice, opus 20
A tes genoux. Prière, opus 10
Alice. Mazurka
Astre des nuits. Berceuse, opus 21
Au bord de l'eau. Nocturne, opus 19
Au déclin du jour. Nocturne, opus 3
Au gré des flots. Barcarolle, opus 7
Bolero
Bridal Gifts. Valse
Cascades et ruisseaux. Grande valse, opus 6
Chant d'amour. Barcarolle, opus 37
Chateaux en Espagne. Fantasie Bolero, opus 23
Columbia Galop
Dames et Chevaliers. Polka-Mazurka,  opus 18
Douce ivresse! Valse brillante, opus 38
Deep in my Heart
Dors mignonne. Berceuse, opus 55
Drifting with the Tide
Driven from Home. Valse de salon
Echos du bal. Impromptu-Mazurka, opus 22
Étincelant – Sparkling. Polka
Farewell!
Fête au village. Ronde, opus 15
Fleur des champs. Valse de salon
Gabrielle. Galop di Bravura
Galop de bravoure, opus 52
Galop-Etude, opus 16
God Bless the Little Church
Good-bye, but come again
Good-bye, Old Home. Meditation
Grande valse, opus 37
I said to my Love. Idylle
Inquiétude, opus 34
Kiss me Good-Night, Mamma
La chasse
La coupe en main. Brindisi, Opus 27
La Manola – Sweet Love, arise
La petite Fadette. Scène champêtre, opus 40; also listed as opus 41
La sauterelle. Polka-Mazurka, opus 4
Le Bosphore. Caprice, opus 12
Le Bourg de Batz. Danse bretonne, opus 40
Le Vallon. Méditation
Loin du bruit. Rêverie, Opus 29 (I); also listed as opus 31
Lovely Maiden. Quartet. Rigoletto
Madaline. Polka
Madrid. Bolero, opus 8
Marche triomphale, opus 36
Menuet de Haydn, opus 29
Menuet, opus 31
Murmuring Waves (transcription of G. W. Scott's song The Lone Rock by the Sea)
My dear old sunny Home (reverie on melody by Will S. Hay)
My Father's Home
My Southern Sunny Home
Neptune Grand March
Nobody's Darling
Ombres et rayons. Caprice-Polka, opus 14
Only a Little Flower. Mazurka
Pendant la valse. Scène dramatique, opus 26
Perles et Diamans. Mazurka, opus 2
Pianto. Élégie, opus 24
Plainte des Fleurs
Rayonnement. Valse, opus 30
Rien sans toi!, opus 11
Romance sans paroles, opus 35
Romeo and Juliet Waltz
Ronde des matelots. Caprice, opus 9
Rose pompon. Mazurka
Scherzo, opus 33
See how the pale Moon shineth. Nocturne
Separation
Sighing Billows. Fantaisie
Sleep sweetly, Love, and well. Lullaby
Solo de Concert. opus 21
Spring and Autumn. Tyrolienne
Stamboul! Mazurka, opus 5
Sweet Thoughts. Nocturne
Take me home. March
Toast. Brindise
Transports.  Valse caprice, opus 41
Truly Yours. Idylle
Une nuit à Grenade. Sérénade, opus 13
Vision. Romance sans paroles, Opus 28
Warrior's Dream. Grande Marche
Download free scores by Leonie Tonel at the International Music Score Library Project (IMSLP)

References 

French women composers
1886 deaths
Conservatoire de Paris alumni
French pianists